Don L. Tripp (born February 23, 1946 in Pasadena, California) is an American politician who served as a Republican member of the New Mexico House of Representatives for District 49 from January 1999 to 2017.

Education
Tripp earned his BA from New Mexico Institute of Mining and Technology.

Elections
 2012 Tripp was unopposed for the June 5, 2012 Republican Primary, winning with 1,661 votes and won the November 6, 2012 General election with 9,213 votes (98%) against Democratic write-in candidate Dell Washington.
 1998 To challenge District 49 incumbent Democratic Representative Michael Olguin, Tripp won the June 2, 1998 Republican Primary with 1,760 votes (77.1%) and won the November 3, 1998 General election with 3,425 votes (52.8%) against Representative Olguin (the results are reversed).
 2000 Tripp was unopposed for the 2000 Republican Primary, winning with 1,281 votes; former Representative Olguin won against a challenger, setting up a rematch. Tripp won the November 7, 2000 General election with 4,000 votes (58.9%) against former Representative Olguin.
 2002 Tripp was unopposed for the 2002 Republican Primary, winning with 1,432 votes and won the November 5, 2002 General election, winning with 3,900 votes (66.4%) against Democratic nominee Salomon Mantano.
 2004 Tripp was unopposed for the June 1, 2004 Republican Primary, winning with 1,064 votes and won the November 2, 2004 General election with 7,376 votes (60.6%) against Democratic nominee Ravi Bhasker.
 2006 Tripp was unopposed for both the June 6, 2006 Republican Primary, winning with 1,641 votes and the November 7, 2006 General election, winning with 7,651 votes.
 2008 Tripp was unopposed for both the June 8, 2008 Republican Primary, winning with 2,061 votes and the November 4, 2008 General election, winning with 9,688 votes.
 2010 Tripp was unopposed for both the June 1, 2010 Republican Primary, winning with 2,250 votes and the November 2, 2010 General election, winning with 8,089 votes.

References

External links
 Official page at the New Mexico Legislature
 Campaign site
 
 Don Tripp at Ballotpedia
 Don Tripp at the National Institute on Money in State Politics

1946 births
Living people
New Mexico Institute of Mining and Technology alumni
Republican Party members of the New Mexico House of Representatives
People from Pasadena, California
People from Socorro, New Mexico
Speakers of the New Mexico House of Representatives
21st-century American politicians